Dakota Ryan Hudson (born September 15, 1994) is an American professional baseball pitcher for the St. Louis Cardinals of Major League Baseball (MLB). He made his MLB debut in 2018.

Amateur career
Hudson attended Sequatchie County High School in Dunlap, Tennessee. During his junior year in 2012, he committed to Mississippi State University to play college baseball. As a senior, he had a 1.09 earned run average (ERA) with 124 strikeouts in 64 innings. Hudson was drafted by the Texas Rangers in the 36th round of the 2013 Major League Baseball draft, but he did not sign and attended Mississippi State.

As a freshman in 2014, Hudson started five games and made one relief appearance. He went 1–2 with a 4.67 ERA and 10 strikeouts. As a sophomore in 2015, he made 17 appearances in relief, going 1–1 with a 4.32 ERA with 26 strikeouts. Hudson then pitched for the Hyannis Harbor Hawks of the Cape Cod Baseball League in the summer of 2015 before returning to starting his junior year in 2016. Hudson started 17 games for the Bulldogs, going 9–5 with a 2.55 ERA and 115 strikeouts in 113 innings pitched. He was named to the All-SEC First Team.

Professional career

Minor leagues

Hudson was considered a top prospect for the 2016 Major League Baseball draft, and he was drafted by the St. Louis Cardinals in the first round (34th overall). He signed for $2M and was assigned to the Gulf Coast League Cardinals, and after pitching four scoreless innings in four games, was promoted to the Palm Beach Cardinals, where he finished the season with a 1–1 record and 0.96 ERA in eight appearances out of the bullpen. He began 2017 with the Springfield Cardinals and was named the starting pitcher for the Texas League All-Star Game, which took place on June 27.  After earning a 9–4 record and 2.53 ERA in 18 starts, he was promoted to the Memphis Redbirds on July 29. For Memphis, he started seven games, posting a 1–1 record and 4.42 ERA. He was named the Texas League Pitcher of the Year.

Hudson was a non-roster invitee to 2018 spring training. He began the 2018 season in Memphis, and was named the starting pitcher for the Pacific Coast League All-Star Game that was played on July 11. In July 2018, he was selected to represent the Cardinals in the 2018 All-Star Futures Game.

St. Louis Cardinals (2018–present)
Hudson was promoted to the major leagues on July 27, 2018. He spent the remainder of the season in St. Louis, compiling a 4–1 record with a 2.63 ERA and a 1.35 WHIP in  relief innings pitched.

Hudson was named St. Louis' fifth starter going into the 2019 season. Over 33 games (32 starts) during the regular season, he went 16-7 with a 3.35 ERA, striking out 136 over  innings, and had the highest ground balls percentage in the majors (56.9%), and the lowest fly balls percentage in the majors (21.3%). He led all major league pitchers in walks, with 86, had the highest walks/9 innings ratio in the major leagues (4.43), had the highest walks percentage in the major leagues (11.4%), and had the worst strikeouts/walks ratio in the majors (1.58).

On September 28, 2020, Hudson underwent Tommy John surgery. On the year, Hudson had recorded a 2.77 ERA over 39 innings pitched.

On April 15, 2021, Hudson was placed on the 60-day injured list as he continued to recover from Tommy John surgery. He was activated on September 24, and pitched  innings for the Cardinals in 2021.

In 2022 he was 8-7 with a 4.45 ERA, and had the lowest strikeout:walk ratio among major league pitchers, at 1.3.

On January 13, 2023, Hudson agreed to a one-year, $2.65 million contract with the Cardinals, avoiding salary arbitration.

Personal life
Hudson proposed to girlfriend Ashlen Cyr in March 2017. The two were married on December 9, 2017, and their first child, a son, was born on May 7, 2018.

References

External links

Mississippi State Bulldogs bio

1994 births
Living people
Sportspeople from Chattanooga, Tennessee
Baseball players from Tennessee
Major League Baseball pitchers
St. Louis Cardinals players
Mississippi State Bulldogs baseball players
Hyannis Harbor Hawks players
Gulf Coast Cardinals players
Palm Beach Cardinals players
Springfield Cardinals players
Memphis Redbirds players